Group B of the 2007 Fed Cup Europe/Africa Zone Group III was one of two pools in the Europe/Africa zone of the 2007 Fed Cup. Five teams competed in a round robin competition, with the top team advanced to Group I for 2008.

Latvia vs. Malta

Ireland vs. Montenegro

Ireland vs. Malta

Moldova vs. Montenegro

Latvia vs. Montenegro

Ireland vs. Moldova

Latvia vs. Ireland

Moldova vs. Malta

Latvia vs. Moldova

Malta vs. Montenegro

  placed first in this group and thus advanced to Group II for 2008, where they placed fourth in their pool of four and were thus relegated back to Group III for 2009.

See also
Fed Cup structure

References

External links
 Fed Cup website

2007 Fed Cup Europe/Africa Zone